Blanfordia japonica is a species of land snail which has an operculum, a terrestrial gastropod mollusk in the family Pomatiopsidae.

Distribution 
This species is endemic to Japan. The type locality is Sado.

It is a Near Threatened species.

Description

Ecology 
This species lives from coastal areas to inland forests.

References

External links 
  江川 和文 Ekawa K. (1985). "福井県産イツマデガイの諸知見 [A Note on Blanfordia japonica from Fukui Prefecture]". ちりぼたん Newsletter of the Malacological Society of Japan 15(4): 93-97. CiNii.

Pomatiopsidae
Gastropods described in 1861